Operation Mar Lewe was a three-day International Security Assistance Force operation started in the early hours of Friday 29 May 2009 when the Taliban were attacked as the Afghan Security Forces and British Army struck at enemy positions around the village of Yatimchay,  south of Musa Qaleh, Helmand Province, Afghanistan. "Mar Lewe" is Pashto for "snake wolf".

The British Army forces were from the 2nd Battalion Royal Regiment of Fusiliers, a well trained, operationally hardened Light Role Infantry Battalion.

References 

Military operations of the War in Afghanistan (2001–2021) involving the United Kingdom
Battles of the War in Afghanistan (2001–2021)
NATO operations in Afghanistan
2009 in Afghanistan